Middelberg is a surname. Notable people with the surname include:
 Mathias Middelberg (born 1964), German lawyer and politician
 Walter Middelberg (1875–1944), Dutch rower